Polycephaly is the condition of having more than one head. The term is derived from the Greek stems poly (Greek: "πολύ") meaning "many" and kephalē (Greek: "κεφαλή") meaning "head". A polycephalic organism may be thought of as one being with a supernumerary body part, or as two or more beings with a shared body.

Two-headed animals (called bicephalic or dicephalic) and three-headed (tricephalic) animals are the only type of multi-headed creatures seen in the real world, and form by the same process as conjoined twins from monozygotic twin embryos.

In humans, there are two forms of twinning that can lead to two heads being supported by a single torso. In dicephalus parapagus dipus, the two heads are side by side. In craniopagus parasiticus, the two heads are joined directly to each other, but only one head has a functional torso. Survival to adulthood is rare, but does occur in some forms of dicephalus parapagus dipus.

There are many occurrences of multi-headed animals in  mythology. In heraldry and vexillology, the double-headed eagle is a common symbol, though no such animal is known to have ever existed.

Occurrences

Two-headed people and animals, though rare, have long been known to exist and documented.

Occurrence in humans

In humans, as in other animals, partial twinning can result in formation of two heads supported by a single torso. Two ways this can happen are dicephalus parapagus, where there are two heads side by side, and craniopagus parasiticus, where the heads are joined directly.

Dicephalus parapagus dipus
In dicephalus parapagus dipus, the two heads are side by side, on a torso with two legs, with varying levels of twinning of organs and structures within the torso. The shared body may have four arms altogether, or three arms, or two arms only. There are Greek-based medical terms for the variations, e.g. dibrachius means two-armed, tribrachius means three-armed. Both heads may contain a fully formed brain, or one may be anencephalic.
If carried to term, dicephalus parapagus twins are usually stillborn, or die soon after birth. Survival to adulthood does however occasionally occur in cases where the twins are born with three to four arms. Chances of survival are improved if two complete hearts are present. Separation surgery is contraindicated, except in cases where one of the twins is clearly dying.

Giacomo and Giovanni Battista Tocci (born between 1875 and 1877), were dicephalus parapagus dipus twins who survived to adulthood. Each had his own pair of arms. They learned to speak several languages, but never learned to walk. Abigail and Brittany Hensel, born in 1990, are another instance of dicephalus parapagus dipus twins who grew up. They were born with two functional arms, plus a vestigial third arm, which was surgically removed. Each twin has her own complete head, heart and spine, and controls one arm and one leg. They developed good motor skills, and completed courses at school and university.

Craniopagus parasiticus

Craniopagus parasiticus is an extremely rare condition in which the two heads are joined directly together, and one twin (known as the autosite) has a functioning torso, while the other (known as the parasite) has only a vestigial torso. The parasite is supported by blood supplied from the autosite head. This threatens the life of the autosite by placing an additional burden on the autosite's vital organs. Operations to separate the two heads have been performed in the hope of saving the autosite.

Occurrence in animals

Polycephalic animals often make local news headlines when found. The most commonly observed two-headed animals are turtles and snakes. Other species with known two-headed occurrences include cattle, sheep, pigs, cats, dogs, and fish. In 1894, a two-headed partridge was reported in Boston, Massachusetts. It was notable as a dicephalic animal for surviving into adulthood with two perfect heads. Scientists have published in modern journals about dissecting such animals since at least the 1930s. A 1929 paper studied the anatomy of a two-headed kitten.

Polycephalic animals, due to their rarity, are a subject of novelty. "We", a two-headed albino rat snake born in captivity in 2000 with both female and male genitalia, was scheduled to be auctioned on eBay with an expected price tag of $150,000 (£87,000), though their policy of not trading in live animals prevented the sale. On October 31, 2006, the World Aquarium announced that "We" was adopted by Nutra Pharma Corporation, a biotechnology company developing treatments using modified cobra venom and cobratoxin. "We" died of natural causes at age eight in June 2007, not long after being acquired by Nutra Pharma.

Two-headed farm animals sometimes travel with animal side shows to county fairs. Most notably, The Venice Beach Freakshow supposedly houses the largest collection of two-headed specimens in the world, including over 20 two-headed animals that are alive. Many museums of natural history contain preserved two-headed animals. The Museum of Lausanne in Lausanne, Switzerland, and the Ripley's Believe It Or Not! museum in Gatlinburg, Tennessee, have collections of preserved two-headed animals. A very well preserved 2-headed lamb is on display in Llanidloes museum in Wales. A live two-headed turtle named Janus can be seen at the Natural History Museum in Geneva, Switzerland.

Anatomy and fitness

In cases where multiple heads are fully developed and non-parasitic, they share control of the organs and limbs, though the specific structure of the connections varies. Animals often move in a disoriented and dizzy fashion, with the brains "arguing" with each other; some animals simply zig-zag without getting anywhere. Snake heads may attack and even attempt to swallow each other. Thus, polycephalic animals survive poorly in the wild compared to normal monocephalic animals.

Most two-headed snakes only live for a few months, though some have been reported to live a full life and even reproduced, with the offspring born normal. A two-headed black rat snake with separate throats and stomachs survived for 20 years. A two-headed albino rat snake named "We" survived in captivity for 8 years. There is some speculation that the inbreeding of snakes in captivity increases the chances of a two-headed birth.

Questions on number of organisms

It is difficult to draw the line between what is considered "one animal with two heads" or "two animals that share a body".

Abigail and Brittany Hensel, born in 1990, were given two distinct names at birth. They identify as two people, and are recognised as two people legally and socially. On the other hand, Syafitri, born 2006 in Indonesia, were given one name by their parents because they only had one heart. In early Germany, conjoined twins that could not be separated were legally considered one person. Millie and Christine McKoy were often referred to in the singular, including by themselves, with the name "Millie-Christine", as well as plural.

In Peter Mogila’s 17-century Catechism, the following instructions are given for baptism of polycephalic infants: should there be distinct heads and distinct chests, this means there are separate people each of whom must be baptised normally; if the heads and chests are not completely distinct from each other, however, one person must be baptised normally but baptism of the other(s) should be preluded by the formula "if not already baptised".

With other animals, polycephaly is usually described as "one animal with two heads". One of the heads, especially in three-headed animals, may be poorly developed and malformed, and not "participate" much.

Two faces on one head

Where twinning of the head itself is only partial, it can result in the condition known as diprosopus—one head with two faces.

Earliest known occurrence

The February 22, 2007, issue of the journal Biology Letters detailed the discovery of a 122 million-year-old fossil of a two-headed Hyphalosaurus lingyuanensis, marking the earliest known occurrence of axial bifurcation.

List of notable occurrences

Humans

Dicephalic conjoined twins (dicephalus parapagus dipus)

 Lycosthenes described a pair of adult female twins who had separate necks but one body. Both heads ate, drank, slept, and spoke. They had to beg from door to door, "everie one giveing (sic) to her freely". They were banished to Bavaria due to fears pregnant women who saw them would give birth to similar children; nothing else is known of them.
 In 1990 Abigail and Brittany Hensel were born in Minnesota, United States.
 In 2000 Ayse and Sema Tanrikulu were born in Kahramanmaraş, Turkey
 In June 2000 Carmen and Lupita Andrade were born in Veracruz, Mexico. They later moved to the United States for healthcare with their parents.
 In 2003 Sohna and Mohna were born in India
 On June 13, 2003, twin girls named Huda and Manal Abdel Nasser Mohammed Mahmoud, were born in Asyut, Egypt
 In 2006 Syafitri was born in Indonesia
 In 2007 Mary Grace and Mary Divine Asis were born in the Philippines with only one heart. They died on April 30, 2008.
 On August 25, 2008, a baby boy named Kiron was born with two heads in south-western Bangladesh. The baby was described by the gynaecologist present at the birth as having "one stomach and he is eating normally with his two mouths. He has one genital organ and a full set of limbs". He died on August 28, 2009.
 In July 2009, dicephalic twins were born in Indonesia with two hearts but  sharing all other internal organs.
 In 2011 Sueli Ferreira gave birth to a child with two heads in Campina Grande, in Paraíba state, Brazil, but the baby died a few hours later because of lack of oxygen to one of the heads.
 On December 19, 2011, a pair of male twins, Emanoel and Jesus Nazare, were born in Marajó Island, Brazil. The children had two heads, two legs and two arms, sharing all the body below the neck. Each child had a separate spine, but shared a heart, liver, lungs and pelvis, and both brains functioned. The boys appeared on the Channel 4 programme Bodyshock on December 19, 2012, where it was reported they had died at six months.
 In March 2014 dicephalic twin girls were delivered via caesarian section at Cygnus JK Hindu Hospital in Sonipat, Haryana, in northern India. The babies reportedly have two heads, two necks and two spinal columns but share all major organs.

Craniopagus parasiticus
Craniopagus parasiticus is a condition in which a parasitic twin head with an undeveloped or underdeveloped body is attached to the head of a developed twin. Recorded cases include:
 In 1783 the "Two-Headed Boy of Bengal" was born in India; the second head was joined roughly upside down on top of the developed twin's head. The boy survived until 1787 and was killed by a snakebite.
 In 2003 Rebeca Martinez was born in the Dominican Republic with an extra head but died 7 hours after surgery at the age of 8 weeks.
 In 2004 Egyptian Naglaa Mohamed gave birth to Manar Maged who had the head and undeveloped torso of another child attached. In 2005 the second head was removed and later that year Naglaa appeared on The Oprah Winfrey Show with her surviving child. Manar died from a brain infection in 2006.
 On January 20, 2021, a baby was born with two heads, at the Elias Hospital in Bucharest, Romania, but died some hours after it was born.

Non-human mammals

Cats

There have been numerous reports of two-faced cats; most die soon after birth. Reports of two-headed kittens are common, relative to other animals, because of their status as household pets.
Recent two-headed kittens include:
 On May 20, 2020, a two-faced kitten named Biscuits and Gravy was born in Oregon. He died after three days.
 On June 11, 2013, a two-faced kitten named Deucy was born in Amity, Oregon. She died two days later.
 In November 2008, a two-faced kitten was born in Perth, Australia.
 In 2006, Tiger, a two-faced kitten, was born in Grove City, Ohio.
 In March 2006, Deuce, a two-faced kitten, was born in Lake City, Florida, and was euthanized shortly thereafter, having come down with pneumonia.
 In June 2006, Image, a two-faced kitten, was born on and died later that year in Philadelphia, Pennsylvania.
 In June 2005, Gemini, a two-faced kitten, was born in Glide, Oregon.

Polycephalic cats in museums include:
 The Deformed Animals Museum of Llubí, Spain, preserves a two-headed kitten.
 The Museum of Lausanne in Lausanne, Switzerland, preserves a two-headed kitten (pictured).
 The Laing Museum in the small town of Newburgh, Fife, Scotland, preserves the stuffed body of a two-headed kitten born in the 19th century on Mugdrum Island.
 The Georgia State Capitol in Atlanta, Georgia, has a full body taxidermy of a two-faced kitten.
 Ripley's Believe It or Not! Museum on Clifton Hill in Niagara Falls, Ontario (Canada) has a full-body taxidermy of a two-faced kitten.
 Eton College's Natural History Museum has a full-body taxidermy of a two-faced kitten.
 London's Viktor Wynd Museum of Curiosities, Fine Art & Natural History has a skeleton of a two headed kitten, a two headed calf, a two headed (and 8 legged) lamb and others.

Cattle

A full body taxidermy of a two-headed calf is on display at the Garth and Jerri Frehner Museum of Natural History on the Southern Utah University campus in Cedar City, Utah. "The Dancing Calves" were born by natural delivery with considerable assistance from S. T. Nelson of Cedar City, Utah on Mother's Day, May 8, 1949, to a crossbred cow owned by Willard Lund of Paragonah, Utah. The "Father Bull" is unknown but must have been an outstanding Hereford. The double calf was alive and healthy but died during birth. This calf, or calves, joined from the beginning of the neck as far as the belly, with two complete, almost perfect body frames, had but one system of vital organs. Each of the two normal heads had a food channel to one stomach and a breathing channel, or windpipe, to the one set of lungs. The two briskets, or breasts, shared on each side by these calves, contained the one set of lungs on one side and the one heart on the other side. Branching off from the one stomach and digestive system were two channels of elimination. The "Mother Cow" lived and was sold as a "fat cow" in July 1949. This calf was stuffed by C. J. Sanders, taxidermist, 2631 South State Street, Salt Lake City 5, Utah, who stated that it is the most unusual monstrosity he has ever worked with. Dr. A. C. Johnson, of Cedar City, Utah, stated that this was the best specimen of monstrosity in animal life that he has ever seen or heard of in his 47 years of practice as a veterinarian. "The Dancing Calves" were owned by West and Gail Seegmiller who displayed them for many years at their Desert Pearl Cafe (no longer in existence), in Cedar City, Utah. Dr. A. C. Johnson, Dr. T. Donald Bell, William H. Lund, Dr. R. G. Williams, Dr. J. S. Prestwich, Dr. A. L. Graff, S. T. Nelson, and James Hoyle, Jr. all signed as witnesses that they saw the calf in the flesh soon after birth and knew it to be authentic. The calves and original document were donated to the Garth and Jerri Frehner Museum of Natural History on the Southern Utah University campus in Cedar City, Utah, where they are now on display.
 The Deformed Animals Museum of Llubí, Spain, preserves various two-headed specimens.
 A head mount of a two-headed calf is on display in the Museum at the Georgia State Capitol Building in Atlanta, Georgia.
 A two-faced calf is preserved at the Douglas County Museum in Waterville, Washington. The calf lived for ten days after birth.
 The Ripley's Believe It or Not! museum in Gatlinburg, Tennessee, has full body taxidermy of a two-headed calf.
 The Dalton Gang Museum, located in Meade, Kansas, also displays a full body taxidermy of a two-headed calf.
 A two-headed calf mount can be found at the Old State House in Hartford, Connecticut
 A two-headed calf was born in Frankston, Texas, on February 13, 2009. Reportedly, the owner/rancher, J. R. Newman immediately took the calf to his local veterinarian for examination/treatment. The veterinarian, Dr. James Brown, was quoted by a local reporter as saying, "I've seen slight variations [of this condition] but nothing like this before. This is by no means normal."
 A full taxidermy of a two headed calf can be found in Melton Mowbray museum, Leicestershire, UK.
 A full taxidermy of a two headed calf can be found in the Museum of Marxell (in the Northern Black Forest in Germany). The calf was born by a local cow and died shortly after birth by natural causes.
 A full taxidermy of a two-headed calf is on display at the Ohio Historical Society.
 A taxidermy of a two-headed calf was previously on display at Hereford Museum and Art Gallery.
 A full body taxidermy of a two headed calf can be seen at the Grant County Historical Museum in Canyon City, Oregon. A card next to the specimen states the heifer was born on the Bob Sprout ranch near Mt. Vernon, and that the calf had 2 hearts, lungs, and 2 spinal columns. Also at the museum are the mounted heads of two diprosopus (two-faced) calves.
 A full taxidermy of a two-headed calf is on display at the Haifa Zoo, in Haifa, Israel.
 A taxidermy specimen of a two headed calf can be seen at the Michigan State University Museum in their Cabinet of Curiosities exhibit. The two-headed calf was born in Fowler, Michigan, in 1943 and is often paired with a dwarf calf that was born on a farm in Owendale, Michigan, in 1909.
 A full taxidermy of a two-headed calf can be seen advertising ice cream for College of the Ozarks in Branson, Missouri, where it was delivered by the students.
 Two full body taxidermies of two-headed calves can be seen at the Huron County Museum in Goderich, Ontario.
 A full taxidermy of a two-headed calf is on display at the Miami County Museum in Peru, Indiana
 A full body taxidermy of a two-headed calf is on display at the Finnish Museum of Natural History in Helsinki
A taxidermy of a two-headed calf can be found in St. Petersburg, FL in the U.S. at the St. Petersburg Museum of History.
A two-headed calf is displayed at the Bay Beach Wildlife Sanctuary in Green Bay, Wisconsin.
The Woolly Mammoth Antiques & Oddities shop in Chicago's Andersonville neighborhood displays a two-headed calf named Brussels Sprouts, originally from Belgium.

Pigs

 The Deformed Animals Museum of Llubí, Spain, preserves a two-headed pig.
 A preserved two headed piglet can be seen at the Museum of Witchcraft, Boscastle, Cornwall, England.
 A two-headed piglet can be found at the Old State House in Hartford, Connecticut.
 In 1998, Rudy, a two-headed pig, was born in Iowa.
 A two-headed piglet appeared on one episode of Oddities.
 A two-headed piglet was a display at the Stearns County Museum in St. Cloud, Minnesota, until the mid-1970s, but cannot be confirmed; it may have been creative taxidermy.

Goats and sheep

 In 1577, a lamb with three heads was born in Blandy, France, and illustrated in Ambroise Pare's Of Monsters and Prodigies. All three heads would bleat simultaneously, and it appears to have survived into adulthood.
 Maine's Conant Museum had an adult sheep skeleton with two heads.
 Various two-headed sheep can be seen in the Bar Central Museum of Llubí, Spain.
 In 2006, a two-headed lamb was born in Shandong, China.
 The Ripley's Believe It Or Not! museum in Gatlinburg, Tennessee, has a mount.
 The Llanidloes town museum in Powys, Wales, has an example of a two-headed lamb.
 The Liebig Extract of Meat Company factory (now a museum) in Fray Bentos, Uruguay, has a preserved two-headed lamb.

Mice 

 A two-headed mouse was seen at Hallæ.

Birds 

 An account of a two-headed pigeon was published in France in 1734.
 In 2020, a two-headed song thrush was poached in Syria.

Reptiles

Snakes
Most polycephalic snakes do not live long, but some captive individuals do.

 Wyman saw a 2-headed snake, alive, in the Jardin des Plantes, Paris, in 1853.
 Leidy found a 2-headed snake in a field near Philadelphia.
 A two-headed black rat snake with separate throats and stomachs survived for 20 years.
 There are several preserved two-headed snakes on display in the Museum at the Georgia State Capitol Building in Atlanta.
 "We", the two-headed albino rat snake (see above)
 A two-headed ladder snake, Elaphe scalaris, was discovered near the village of Pinoso, Spain.
 A two-headed king snake lived for nearly 17 years at the Arizona State University.
 A extremely rare two-headed albino Honduran milk snake named Medusa was bought by Todd Ray

Turtles

Two-headed turtles and tortoises are rare but not unknown. Recent discoveries include:
 In 1999, a three-headed turtle was discovered in Tainan, Taiwan, by a villager named Lin Chi-fa.
 In 2003, a two-headed angulate tortoise was discovered in South Africa, with the only other known case in the region reported in the early 1980s.
 In 2004, Solomon and Sheba, a two-headed Mediterranean spur-thighed tortoise, was born in Dorchester, England.
 In 2005, a two-headed olive ridley sea turtle was found in Costa Rica by the World Wildlife Fund.
 In 2005, a baby turtle of unknown species was also reported in Havana, Cuba, in 2005.
 In 2006, a two-headed, six-limbed soft-shell turtle in Singapore named "Double Happiness" was also featured on a local television program, and again on another program in late 2006.
 In December 2021, a living two-headed Greek tortoise named Janus born in 1997 was displayed in the Museum of Natural History of Geneva.
 As of 2007, there is a fully preserved common snapping turtle named Emily with two heads at the Science Museum of Minnesota.
 In February 2011, a two-headed turtle was uncovered in Garner, North Carolina.
 A two-headed Florida redbelly turtle named Gege lived at the Homosassa Springs Wildlife State Park, transferred to a zoo where it spent the rest of its natural life until summer of 2008.
 A two-headed turtle is currently on display at the Coex Aquarium in Seoul, South Korea.
 A two-headed turtle was released into the ocean with about 50 other turtles as part of a Broward County, Florida hatching turtle rescue program on July 19, 2012.
 A two-headed turtle named Thelma and Louise was born at the San Antonio Zoo on June 18, 2013.
 A two-headed yellow-bellied slider lives at the Herpetarium in the Greensboro Science Center in North Carolina.
A two-headed red-eared slider is on display at the Sideshow Museum in Uranus, Missouri.

Choristoderes
In 2006, the UK Royal Society announced that it had discovered a two-headed fossil of Hyphalosaurus, the first recorded time that such a reptile has been found fossilized.

Mythological occurrences

Mesopotamian mythology
 Mušmaḫḫu, a seven headed serpent related to mythology of Ninurta, and Ningishzida. Sometimes related to Mušḫuššu.
 Humbaba, the guardian of the Cedar Forest, where the gods lived. A description from Georg Burckhardt translation of Gilgamesh says, "he had the paws of a lion and a body covered in thorny scales; his feet had the claws of a vulture, and on his head were the horns of a wild bull; his tail and phallus each ended in a snake's head."

Greek mythology

Greek mythology contains a number of multi-headed creatures. Typhon, a vast grisly monster with many snake heads, is often described as having several offspring with Echidna, a creature with the lower body of a serpent but the upper body of a beautiful woman. Their offspring, by one source or another, account for many of the major monsters of Greek mythos, including:
 Cerberus – a monstrous multi-headed dog that guards the gate to Hades.
 Ladon – a sometimes hundred-headed serpent-like dragon that guards the garden of the Hesperides and is overcome by Heracles.
 Chimera – sometimes depicted with the heads of a goat and a lion.
 The Lernaean Hydra – an ancient nameless serpent-like chthonic water beast that possessed numerous heads.
 Orthrus – a two-headed dog owned by Geryon.
 Scylla – sometimes described as a six-headed sea monster.

Other multi-headed creatures in Greek mythology include:
 The Hecatonchires – giants with fifty heads and one hundred arms. The word "Hecatonchire" means "hundred arms". They were the sons of Gaia, and Uranus.
 Hecate – Greek goddess of witches, nightmares, crossroads, and one of the Moon deities; sometimes represented with three heads.

Iranian mythology
Zahhak, an evil figure in Iranian mythology - also evident in ancient Iranian folklore as Aži Dahāka (Azh dahak) - is the most significant and long-lasting of the ažis of the Avesta, the earliest religious texts of Zoroastrianism. He is described as a monster with three mouths, six eyes, and three heads (presumably meaning three heads with one mouth and two eyes each), cunning, strong and demonic.  But in other respects Aži Dahāka has human qualities, and is never a mere animal.

Hinduism

Hindu deities are often depicted with multiple arms or heads.
 The fire-god Agni has two heads
 Dattatreya: three
 The creator-god Brahma: four
 The goddess Gayatri: five
 The war-god Kartikeya: six
Though usually depicted with one head, some deities like Ganesha (in Heramba form) and Shiva (Sadashiva) have aspects where they are depicted with multiple heads; five in this case. The Vishvarupa form of Vishnu is described as having infinite heads.

Besides deities, demons (asura and rakshasa) may be depicted with multiple heads. The demon-king Ravana Ravana is depicted and described as having ten heads, although sometimes he is shown with only nine heads because he has sacrificed a head to convince Shiva. Trishira his son is depicted with three heads.

Animal races in Hindu mythology like Nāgas (serpents) may have multiple heads. The Naga Shesha is depicted with five or seven hoods, but said to have infinite hoods. Uchchaihshravas is a celestial seven-headed horse. The divine white elephant Airavata is depicted with multiple heads, trunks and tusks.

Taoism
 Nezha, a god sometimes shown in "three heads and six arms" form

Occultism
 Bune, a dragon with the heads of a dog, a griffin, and a man, in occultism

Ancient Mediterranean civilizations

 Janus, a two- or four-faced god in Roman mythology
 Nehebkau, a two-headed snake in Egyptian mythology

European culture
 Various Ogres, Trolls, and Giants in European folklore and fairy tales
 Double-headed eagle, a heraldic symbol
 Lernaean Hydra, Greek Mythology

Eastern Europe
 Balaur, a dragon with three, seven or twelve heads, in Romanian mythology
Kucedra, with three, seven or nine heads in Albanian mythology
 Svantevit, four-headed god of war and divination in Slavic mythology
 Triglav (meaning "three headed") is a god or complex of gods in Slavic mythology
 Zmey Gorynych, a dragon in Slavic mythology
 Dragons in Hungarian folklore usually have three or seven heads

Northern Europe
 Þrúðgelmir, a six-headed giant in Norse mythology

Japan
 Yamata no Orochi, an eight-headed snake in Japanese mythology

Korea
 Jihaguk Daejeok, a nine-headed giant in Korean mythology

Judaism
The Talmud (Brachot 61a) says that originally Adam was created as a single body with two faces (which were then separated into two bodies - male (Adam) & female (Eve)).

The Zohar (introduction 1:9B / p. 9B) speaks of descendants of Cain with 2 heads.

The Talmud (Menachot 37a)  records an incident in which Phlimo asked Judah the Prince, which head a two headed person should put on Tefillin. Judah was initially dismissive, but then another man came in saying that his wife had just given birth to a two headed baby, and asked a (different) halachic question.

Heraldry

 Double-headed eagle
 Triple-headed eagle

See also
 Amphisbaena
 Cephalic disorder
 Chimera
 Conjoined twins
 The Corleck Head
 Diprosopus
 Janus
 Abby and Brittany Hensel
 Supernumerary body part
 Three hares
 Vladimir Demikhov

References

External links

Supernumerary body parts
Conjoined twins
Multiple births